Hardin Township is a township in Pottawattamie County, Iowa, USA.

History
Hardin Township was organized in 1869. It is named for Richard "Old Dick" Hardin, a pioneer settler.

References

Townships in Pottawattamie County, Iowa
Townships in Iowa